KYUS may refer to:

 KYUS-FM, a radio station (92.3 FM) licensed to Miles City, Montana
 KYUS-TV, a television station (channel 3) licensed to Miles City, Montana, repeating KULR-TV